Tüddern safari park was a zoo and Germany's first safari park located in Selfkant.

The Zoo was founded in 1968, and covered  while in reality only  were developed.

The Safari park included lions, tigers, baboons, while the classical zoo included chimpanzee, asian elephants and hippos.

The zoo was closed in 1990 due to lack of scientific management. The area is now deserted.

See also 
 List of zoos in Germany

References

External links
 Zoo-ag.de
 All elephants at Tuddern safari park in Germany

Zoos in Germany
Zoos established in 1968
Zoological Garden
Zoological Garden